Asinan is a pickled (through brined or vinegared) vegetable or fruit dish, commonly found in Indonesia. Asin, Indonesian for "salty", is the process of preserving the ingredients by soaking them in a solution of salty water. Asinan is quite similar to rujak, which is usually served fresh, while asinan is preserved vegetables or fruits. Of the many types and variations of asinan in Indonesia, the most popular are asinan Betawi and asinan Bogor. Asinan can be found served in restaurant, warung and also travelling street vendor.

 Asinan Betawi: The vegetable asinan of the Betawi people from Jakarta is preserved Chinese cabbage, cabbage, bean sprouts, tofu, and lettuce served in a thin, hot, peanut sauce with vinegar, topped with peanuts and krupuk (especially krupuk mie).
 Asinan Bogor: The fruit asinan of Bogor city, West Java is preserved tropical fruits, such as raw mango, water apple, papaya, ambarella, jicama, nutmeg and pineapple served in sweet, hot and sour vinegar and chili sauce, sprinkled with peanuts.

Name
Asinan means salty food; in this context are vegetables or fruits. In Surabaya, this kind of dish is called sayur asin (salty vegetable).

Ingredients
Ingredients of asinan sayur has in common with kimchi. Their main ingredients are cabbage, cucumber, and salt. They both have the cabbage salted, but in kimchi the salting process takes longer than the process in asinan. Other ingredients includes bean sprouts, chili, and terasi.

Variants
There are two main variants: asinan sayur and asinan buah (salted vegetable and salted fruit). Asinan sayur is also called asinan Jakarta or asinan Betawi. However, according to Indonesian food expert William Wongso, it doesn't guarantee the dish is original from Jakarta. It might be influenced by Indian, Chinese, Arab, Portuguese, or Dutch cuisine.

See also

References

Indonesian pickles
Salads
Betawi cuisine
Vegetarian dishes of Indonesia
Fruit dishes
Vegetable dishes of Indonesia
Street food in Indonesia